Santa Eulària des Riu is a municipality on the eastern coast of Ibiza. The total number of inhabitants in the municipality (2010) is 32,637.

The municipality encompasses the following towns and villages:

See also
 The Town of Santa Eulària des Riu

Local Government
The current Mayor of Santa Eulària des Riu  is Vicente Alejandro Marí Torres (Partit Popular (Espanya)) (2007)

External links
 Population of the Balearic Islands

References

Municipalities in Ibiza
Mediterranean port cities and towns in Spain
Santa Eulària des Riu